Shake, Rattle & Roll II (stylized onscreen as Shake Rattle & Roll 2) is a 1990 Filipino horror anthology film and the second installment of the Shake, Rattle & Roll film series. A sequel to Shake, Rattle & Roll (1984). The film was distributed by Regal Films and is directed by Peque Gallaga and Lore Reyes. The film is an entry of the 1990 Metro Manila Film Festival. It is the first starring role of Manilyn Reynes before the following sequels.

The third installment, Shake, Rattle & Roll III, was released in 1991.

Plot

"Multo"
Newlyweds Cathy (Janice de Belen) and Mari (Eric Quizon) spend their honeymoon at a rural vacation house in Baguio. They are less welcomed by the old caretaker (Caridad Sanchez) who gives them a tour, including a locked room.

A malevolent presence disturbed the couple's time around the house. During their sleep, Cathy suffers a nightmare of a deranged doctor (Eddie Gutierrez) who tortures a young girl (Isabel Granada) in his clinic. The next day while prepping breakfast, Cathy stumbles on the locked room which turns out to be the doctor's clinic from her dream.

The caretaker reveals the truth behind the house that was built before World War II: it was once owned by the obstetrician Dr. Corpus who murdered and harbored physical torture on young ladies, including his niece Consuelo who was his last victim before the doctor committed suicide inside the clinic. His vengeful spirit remained trapped in the house's premises, including his clinic and personal belongings, to influence the victim and relive his sadistic felony. But, at the same time, Mari snuck into the clinic and wore Corpus' ring. The ghost forbids it from expelling itself at Mari's hand to possess him.

During their dinner night, Cathy notices Mari wore the ring. An unpossessed Mari urges for his wife's help to remove it from his hand. Before Cathy could help him, Corpus' spirit repossesses Mari and attacks her as she locks herself into the clinic but the possessed Mari breaks through the door and intends to kill her as she manages to fight him off, releasing him from the ghost's influence. Mari urges Cathy to amputate his finger with the ring to prevent Corpus from coming back. After doing so, Cathy threw the ring into the fireplace as the couple are reunited after the ghost's haunting.

"Kulam"
Bogart (Joey Marquez), a handicapped and overmodest patient, has feelings for Dra. Kalbaryo (Daisy Romualdez), his arrogant but affectionate doctor, who does his check-up. After Kalbaryo finishes his check-up, Bogart's friend, Tiffany (Carmina Villaroel), visits him in his room and starts to talk to him. As Tiffany leaves, Melanie (Sylvia Sanchez), a troubled and flirtatious nurse, begins to have sex with Bogart. When Dra. Kalbaryo returns, she is enraged at seeing them inter-coursing each other and fires Melanie. Kalbaryo berates Bogart for his love for her and reveals her family heritage. Kalbaryo later reveals herself to be a witch, born under her great grandfather who is a witch doctor. When Bogart refuses to profess his love to Kalbaryo, she began to torture him by performing voodoo on him using his hair to a voodoo doll. As Kalbaryo leaves the room, Tiffany, who had left her books in the hospital, returns and Bogart urges her to help him escape.

Kalbaryo, who had noticed that Bogart escaped, found him hiding in the nursery room with Tiffany and turned all the babies into tiyanaks. After escaping, Bogart and Tiffany hide in a laboratory where they find Melanie. They explain about Kalbaryo to the fired nurse who told them that witches use body parts from their victims in their voodoo dolls to perform their voodoo. Tiffany realizes that she had Kalbaryo's hairbrush earlier after they bumped into each other. Melanie distracts Kalbaryo with the hospital's intercom system to allow Tiffany to enter the room and replace Bogart's hair with Kalbaryo's.

Melanie hides Bogart at a morgue for protection but Kalbaryo casts a spell to reanimate the bodies of the bus crash victims from the morgue. After Kalbaryo leaves, Tiffany sneaks into the room and manages to replace the hair in the voodoo doll. Kalbaryo returns and catches Tiffany, after she had replaced the hair, taking the voodoo doll away from her. She forces Tiffany to watch as she turns her friend into a frog. Unaware that the doll has her hair, she turns herself into a frog. Meanwhile, Bogart and Melanie are being attacked by the reanimated bus victims. Tiffany manages to reverse the spell, saving them.

As the trio begins celebrating, Melanie notices Kalbaryo, who was still a frog, follow them and scream for help. After being insulted by Kalbaryo, Melanie traps her in the zoology laboratory where she will be used for dissection.

"Aswang"
Portia (Manilyn Reynes) was invited by her best friend, Monica (Ana Roces), to celebrate the fiesta in her hometown village. After their arrival, she is welcomed by the villagers including Monica's mother (Vangie Labalan) and the town chief (Rez Cortez), but the tricycle driver (Richard Gomez) who brought them to town urges Portia to leave the barrio and get back home to Manila.

While Portia is sleeping, Monica questions her mother about the chieftain's doubts on her about Portia in order to commence with the ceremony for the fiesta. The next day, Portia and Monica are greeted by their fellow friends, Ricky (Aljon Jimenez) and Milo (Anjo Yllana), who are camping outside the barrio. They had followed Portia after she arrived at the village and are convinced about the rumors that the townsfolk are aswangs but she denies their claims.

Later, Portia becomes suspicious of the eccentric nature of the villagers after inspecting their appetite for eating raw meat during their daily meals earlier. On the night of the fiesta, Portia finds the tricycle driver locked in one of the suspended hunting cages who convinced Portia to escape the village, warning her that the townspeople will eat him.

Back at the house, Monica confesses to Portia that the rumors behind the town are actually true and that the residents are a group of aswangs. She also reveals to her that she lures virgins into the barrio as a human sacrifice to commemorate their feast every year. As a result, their next victim is Portia as Monica attempts to sedate her with a drug-tainted tea to initiate the creatures' feast. Portia had already discovered her intention earlier and managed to switch their teas during their conversation. After Monica passes out from the drug, Portia conceals her on the bed with her blanket before the townspeople arrive as the chief unwittingly kills Monica and take her body instead.

While she sneaks out of the barrio to escape, Portia witnesses the townspeople feasting on their victims, including the tricycle driver, during the ceremony before their transformation. The aswangs are infuriated by the death of Monica after realizing Portia's intentions and begin to chase after her through the forest. They are unable to reach her after Portia found a crucifix on the ground to protect herself as she manages to reach the boys' campsite.

The teens intend to escape using their van but are surrounded by the tribe after Portia dropped the crucifix. As the creatures attack and kill Milo, trying to retrieve the crucifix; Portia and Ricky drive away. However, the chieftain chases after them and destroys the van to attack Portia but Ricky manages to defeat and kill him by shooting his cross trinket to his chest using a slingshot.

Eventually, the teens manage to escape from the barrio en route, after Portia suffered nightmares from the aswangs' recent attacks.

Cast

Multo
 Janice de Belen as Cathy
 Eric Quizon as Mari
 Eddie Gutierrez as Dr. Corpus
 Caridad Sanchez as Manang
 Isabel Granada as Consuelo

Kulam
 Joey Marquez as Bogart
 Daisy Romualdez as Dra. Kalbaryo
 Carmina Villaroel as Tiffany
 Sylvia Sanchez as Melanie
 Joey Reyes as Morgue Attendant
 Jinky Laurel as Nurse

Aswang
 Manilyn Reynes as Portia
 Ana Roces as Monica
 Vangie Labalan as Nanay
 Rez Cortez as Tanda
 Aljon Jimenez as Ricky
 Anjo Yllana as Milo
 Mae Anne Adonis as Aswang
 Malu de Guzman as Aswang
 Romy Romulo as Aswang
 Rey Solo as Aswang
 Sammy Brillantes as Aswang
 Lucy Quinto as Aswang
 Eva Ramos as Aswang
 Sieg Diaz as Aswang
 Lilia Cuntapay as Aswang
 Richard Gomez as Tricycle Driver
 The Barasoain Kalinangan Ensemble as Aswangs

Accolades

See also
Shake, Rattle & Roll (film series)
List of ghost films

Notes

References

External links

1990 horror films
1990 films
Philippine comedy horror films
1990s Tagalog-language films
1990s comedy horror films
1990 comedy films
Films directed by Peque Gallaga
Films directed by Lore Reyes